Nowa Nowa is a small town in the Australian state of Victoria. It is in East Gippsland, near Lakes Entrance. At the 2006 census, Nowa Nowa and the surrounding areas including Toorloo Arm had a population of 194.

History
Nowa Nowa Post Office opened on 11 March 1893, though closed for about five years from 1895 to 1900.

Nowa Nowa railway station on the former Orbost railway line opened in April 1916, with the line closing in 1987.

Commercial area
Nowa Nowa has been a timber town relying on local mills for income, however this is no longer the case. There is currently only one mill operating. There are two caravan parks, one general store, one hotel/motel, one healthcare clinic and art galleries. Nowa Nowa is the home of the Nowa Nowa Nudes Art Show held in November each year. Each month there is a Pony Club meet up that draws large numbers of contestants and viewers. There is also a kindergarten, which in 2017 was taught by the Early Childhood Teacher of the year who was assisted by the states best Kindergarten Assistant. Unfortunately the Kindergarten closed in 2020 due to poor management.

Scenery
The Nowa Nowa arm of Lake Tyers starts in Nowa Nowa and this is a picturesque part of the town with picnic grounds and good fishing spots. There are many walks signposted in the area with birds and other wildlife in abundance. One of these is the East Gippsland Rail Trail which lies on the route of the old Orbost railway line and passes through Nowa Nowa.

Mount Nowa Nowa, 2 km NNE of the town has an old wooden fire-tower.  Boggy Creek Gorge is on the northern edge of the town.

Climate

Nowa Nowa has a mild oceanic climate (Csb) with warm summers and cool winters, and moderate rainfall spread throughout the year.

References

Towns in Victoria (Australia)
Shire of East Gippsland